John Bonython may refer to:
 John Langdon Bonython (1848–1939), Australian editor, philanthropist, politician and journalist,  Langdon Bonython
 John Lavington Bonython (1875–1960), Australian publisher and Lord Mayor of Adelaide, son of Langdon Bonython, a.k.a. Lavington Bonython
 John Langdon Bonython (1905–1992), South Australian businessman, grandson of Langdon Bonython, son of Lavington Bonython

See also
Bonython (disambiguation)